Stadio del Trampolino is a ski jumping hill located in Pragelato, Italy. During the 2006 Winter Olympics, it hosted the ski jumping and the ski jumping part of the Nordic combined events.  It also hosted FIS Ski Jumping World Cup events in the 2004–05 and 2008–09 seasons.

References 
2006 Winter Olympics official report. Volume 3. pp. 70–1.
Profile of Stadio del Trampolino at www.skisprungschanzen.com

Venues of the 2006 Winter Olympics
Ski jumping venues in Italy
Olympic Nordic combined venues
Olympic ski jumping venues